Amiche da morire (Friends to Die For) is a 2013 Italian black comedy film written and directed by .

Plot 
Gilda, Olivia and Crocetta are three women who live in a small island of Sicily. The women try to live as they can: Gilda works as a call-girl for the affluent men of the island and the occasional tourist, Olivia is married with the most handsome men in town, a fisherman who is suspiciously always away working, while Crocetta is a spinster and a jinx, bringing bad luck to every man who courts her. The chance of destiny soon arrive as the three women, one night, go to an island cave, because they suspect that Rocco, Olivia's husband, is going to meet an alleged lover there. Actually Rocco is a trafficker, who is trying to hide the loot in the cave. Olivia shoots her husband dead when he reveals that he never cared for her, and the three women decide to make the corpse disappear, and keep the money, but soon the police and criminals colleagues of Rocco put on their trail. In fact, men do not want so much about the death of Rocco, rather than looking for the loot that the women took.

Cast 

Claudia Gerini: Gilda
Cristiana Capotondi: Olivia
Sabrina Impacciatore: Crocetta
Vinicio Marchioni: Inspector Nico Malachia
Marina Confalone: Donna Rosaria
Corrado Fortuna: Lorenzo
Antonella Attili: Miss Zuccalà
Lucia Sardo: Mother of Crocetta

References

External links

2013 films
2013 black comedy films
Italian black comedy films
2013 directorial debut films
2010s Italian-language films
2010s Italian films